Anna (Hana, Anushka) Weizmann (1886 – February 17, 1963) was an Israeli chemist.

Biography 
Anna Weizmann (Hana) was born in a large family to Ezer Weizmann and Rachel-Leah Chemerinskiy. Sister of Chaim Weizmann and Moshe Weizmann. She studied in Zurich from 1905 to 1912. She worked for a year (1913-1914) in Manchester in the chemical laboratory of the University, and lived in the house of her brother. Arriving in Palestine in 1933, she started working at the Institute of Ziv (later renamed the Weizmann Institute) in Rehovot. Upon her retirement in 1959, she was appointed honorary professor at the institute.

Ezer Weizman, President of Israel, was the son of her brother Yechiel.

References

External links 
 Outstanding Personalities of Haif
 The Chaim Weizmann Laboratory

Israeli chemists
Israeli women chemists
Expatriates from the Russian Empire in Switzerland
Expatriates from the Russian Empire in the United Kingdom
Soviet emigrants to Mandatory Palestine
1886 births
1963 deaths
Anna